What Remains: The Life and Work of Sally Mann is a 2005 film directed and produced by Steven Cantor, which documents the photography and story of photographer Sally Mann at her Virginia farm home. The film documents the photographer's progression from a child to a mother, and the struggles Mann faces through her public and private life.

The movie garnered quite favorable reviews from publications such as The New York Times.

See also
 Blood Ties: The Life and Work of Sally Mann

References 

American documentary films
Documentary films about photographers
Films directed by Steven Cantor
Films shot in Virginia
2000s English-language films
2000s American films